The Belgium national rugby union team (German: Belgische Rugby-Nationalmannschaft) represents Belgium in men's international rugby union competitions, nicknamed Diables Noirs / Zwarte Duivels (Black Devils). They are yet to participate in a Rugby World Cup and currently compete in the first division of the Rugby Europe International Championships, which they have been playing in since 2023. Rugby union in Belgium is administered by the Belgian Rugby Federation.

History
The Belgium rugby team played their first match on 13 March 1932 against the Netherlands. They contested annual games against the Netherlands for half a decade starting in 1932. They drew the 1932 game, but lost subsequent matches during the 1930s. They also played Italy and Germany in 1937, losing both games.

During the 1950s, Belgium continued playing the Netherlands, as well as teams like Spain. They managed to obtain a draw in the 1960s against Portugal. In the 1970s they won the majority of their games, as well as playing a broader range of European nations. This trend continued throughout the 1980s. Belgium had a six-game winning streak in the late 1980s. They began playing more games against their regular European opponents as they entered the 1990s. A Belgium side played the Argentina national rugby union team prior to the 2007 Rugby World Cup. A Belgium XV played the Barbarians on 24 May 2008.

Belgium has been steadily improving, ranked number 55th in 2004, the 'Black Devils' improved a whole lot on the following years, obtaining good results against other European Nations, gaining entry to the IRB Ranking's Top 30 in 2010. Since their induction to the first 30 rugby nations in the international ranking, they have managed to maintain their place.

Belgium had a very successful campaign during the 2010-2012 European Nations Cup, with a 10 match winning streak from March 2011 to December 2012. Currently, Belgium plays in the top division of the Rugby Europe International Championships.

Jacques Rogge, the former International Olympic Committee president, was a member of the Belgium national team.

Rugby World Cup qualification

 1987  - Not invited
 1991  - Did not qualify
 1995  - Did not qualify
 1999  - Did not qualify
 2003  - Did not qualify
 2007  - Did not qualify
 2011  - Did not qualify
 2015 - Did not qualify
 2019 - Did not qualify
 2023 - Did not qualify

Current squad
Belgium's 23-man squad for their November international match against Canada on 13 November 2021.

 Head Coach:  Mike Ford
 Note - Players in Italics denotes uncapped players.

Record

Below is a table of the representative rugby matches played by a Belgium national XV at test level up until 7 March 2020.

See also
 Rugby union in Belgium

References

External links
 http://www.rugbyevents.be
 Belgian Rugby Federation
 Belgium XV Official Games
 Belgium on rugbydata.com

 
Rugby union in Belgium
European national rugby union teams
Teams in European Nations Cup (rugby union)